Mohammadabad is a constituency of the Uttar Pradesh Legislative Assembly, and a segment of Ballia Lok Sabha constituency, covering the city of Mohammadabad (also spelled Muhammadabad) in the Ghazipur district of Uttar Pradesh, India. It should not be confused with the assembly segment Muhammadabad-Gohna which falls under Ghosi Lok Sabha seat in Mau district. 

Mohammadabad is one of five assembly constituencies in the Ballia Lok Sabha constituency. Since 2008, this assembly constituency is numbered 378 amongst 403 constituencies.

Members of the Legislative Assembly 

^ = (by-poll) after Krishnanand Rai was murdered in 2005, His wife Alka Rai won.

Election results

2022

2017

 Alka Rai (BJP) : 122,156 votes  
 Sibgatulla Ansari (BSP) : 89,429  (Lost by 32,727 votes)

1977 Vidhan Sabha Elections
 Ram Janam Rai (JNP) : 22,371 votes   
 Krishna Nand Rai (INC) : 20,378  (He was not the same person as 2002 winner from this seat.)

References

External links
 

Assembly constituencies of Uttar Pradesh
Politics of Ghazipur district